Eddie Roberts may refer to:

 Eddie Roberts (boxer) (born 1903), American boxer
 Eddie Roberts (footballer) (born 1947), English footballer
 Eddie Roberts Chifundo, Panamanian footballer with C.D. Árabe Unido 
 Eddie Roberts, musician with The New Mastersounds
 Eddie Roberts, American ice hockey player with the Pittsburgh Victorias, 1902–1904
 Eddy Roberts, American soccer player

See also 
 The Life and Times of Eddie Roberts, an American sitcom in 1980